FC Carolina United is a soccer organization based in Rock Hill, South Carolina near Charlotte, North Carolina. The team announced they would participate in the National Premier Soccer League starting with the 2014 season.  The team will play at Manchester Meadows Soccer Complex which opened in 2006 and has a capacity of 750 seats.  The club is supported by Swedish company Trig.com and with administrative support provided by Discoveries Soccer Club.

References

External links
FC Carolina United website

Soccer teams in South Carolina
National Premier Soccer League teams
2013 establishments in South Carolina
Association football clubs established in 2013
Rock Hill, South Carolina